Aleksei Anatolyevich Zhitnikov (born 7 December 1984) is a Russian former professional footballer.

Club career
He made his debut in the Russian Premier League in 2003 for FC Saturn-RenTV Ramenskoye.

References

External links
 

1984 births
People from Ramensky District
Living people
Russian footballers
Russia under-21 international footballers
Association football midfielders
FC Saturn Ramenskoye players
FC Khimki players
FC Salyut Belgorod players
FC Sibir Novosibirsk players
Russian Premier League players
FC Rotor Volgograd players
FC Volgar Astrakhan players
FC Fakel Voronezh players
FC Vityaz Podolsk players
FC Dynamo Saint Petersburg players
FC Avangard Kursk players
FC Znamya Truda Orekhovo-Zuyevo players
FC Olimp-Dolgoprudny players
Sportspeople from Moscow Oblast